Renate Breuer (born 1 December 1939 in Berlin) is a West German sprint canoeist who competed from the late 1960s to the early 1970s. Competing in two Summer Olympics, she won a silver medal in the K-1 500 m event at Mexico City in 1968.

Breuer also won three medals at the ICF Canoe Sprint World Championships with a gold (K-2 500 m: 1970) and two silvers (K-4 500 m: 1966, 1971).

References

Sports-reference.com profile

1939 births
Canoeists at the 1968 Summer Olympics
Canoeists at the 1972 Summer Olympics
Living people
Canoeists from Berlin
Olympic canoeists of West Germany
Olympic silver medalists for West Germany
West German female canoeists
Olympic medalists in canoeing
ICF Canoe Sprint World Championships medalists in kayak
Medalists at the 1968 Summer Olympics